Estação Globo (Globo Station) premiered in December 2004 to celebrate Rede Globo's 40th anniversary.

The special program featured songs from the soundtracks of soap operas, performed by Globo's famous actors.

Luiz Ferré's Criadores e Criaturas' TV Colosso dog puppets also made a special appearance on this special singing "Eu Não Largo o Osso" sung by Paquitas, and written by Michael Sullivan and Paulo Massadas.

The sets were built by José Cláudio and the special was directed by Jorge Fernando (director of TV Xuxa).

Since then, it became a recurring show on Globo's schedule and is always hosted by popular singer Ivete Sangalo.

Rede Globo original programming
Brazilian television series